Indiana State Highway Bridge 46-11-1316, also known as Bowling Bridge, is a historic Parker through truss bridge located in Washington Township, Clay County, Indiana.  It was built by the Vincennes Bridge Company and erected in 1939.  It carries State Road 46 over the Eel River.  It consists of two 196 foot long spans and rests on concrete abutments and a concrete pier.

It was added to the National Register of Historic Places in 2000, and was delisted in 2020.

References

Road bridges on the National Register of Historic Places in Indiana
Bridges completed in 1939
Transportation buildings and structures in Clay County, Indiana
National Register of Historic Places in Clay County, Indiana
Parker truss bridges in the United States